Killucan station is a former railway station which served the village of Killucan in County Westmeath, Ireland. Previously a stop on the Dublin–Sligo railway line, the station closed in 1963.

History
The station first opened in 1848 serving the villages of Killucan and Rathwire. It closed to passenger traffic in 1947, and closed fully in 1963.

A locally-organised campaign, which was reportedly "ongoing for more than 20 years" , has proposed that the railway station be reopened.

References

Disused railway stations in County Westmeath